Finished People is the fourth album of the Christian metalcore band, Sleeping Giant.

Critical reception
Wayne Reimer of Jesus Freak Hideout writes: "If you weren't a fan of Sleeping Giant before, Finished People might change your mind." Brody B. of Indie Vision Music writes: "Sleeping Giant have not pushed the envelope of the hardcore world by any means with “Finished People” and yet the Salt Lake City based band produce a monster of a hardcore record with enough heart to make up for what it lacks in musical complexity. “Finished People” capitalizes on congregational hardcore worship anthems and challenges listeners everywhere to boldly love and spread the message of Jesus." Tim Dodderidge of Mind Equals Blown writes: "It’s amazing how much Sleeping Giant has grown since their rough debut, and it’s even more amazing to look at the entire scope of their career and realize there’s still some potential left to unlock. Arguably the biggest complaint aside from the lack of screams is that the album’s riffage and melodicism could’ve been a bit more diverse. Despite some unique elements here and there, some tracks run together and a select few stand more stout than others. But the music is of higher quality on these guys’ newest work than any of their others, and it showcases a band tapping into their deepest, most inspired passion, tenacity, and honesty in a genre where those traits are extremely important. Sleeping Giant continually is a breath of fresh air thanks to their intensely passionate God-breathed metal tunes, and Finished People is prime evidence of this."

Track listing

Credits
Sleeping Giant
 Tom Green - Vocals
 Geoff Brouillette - Guitar
 Matt Weir - Drums
Additional Musicians
 Drew Di Jorio - Guest Vocals on track 9
 Bruce Lepage - Guest Vocals on track 4
 Levi the Poet - Guest Vocals on track 7
 Joel Muniz - Guest Vocals on track 10
 Joe Musten - Guest Vocals on track 3
 Nate Rebolledo - Guest Vocals on track 3
 Brook Reeves - Guest Vocals on track 2
Personnel
 William Putney - Mastering
 Orie McGinness - Artwork
 Andrew P. Glover - Engineer, Mixing, Producer
 Justin Bernardez - Assistant Engineer, Mixing

References

Sleeping Giant (band) albums
Century Media Records albums
2014 albums